Converse County is a county located in the U.S. state of Wyoming. As of the 2020 United States Census, the population was 13,751. Its county seat is Douglas.

History
Converse County was created in 1888 by the legislature of the Wyoming Territory, of area annexed from Albany and Laramie counties.

Converse County was named for A.R. Converse, a banker and rancher from Cheyenne, Wyoming, who was co-owner with Francis E. Warren in a large ranch in the eastern part of Converse County.

A portion of Converse County territory was annexed for the formation of Niobrara County in 1911.  Converse County was slightly enlarged with territory from Albany County in 1955 after a special election.

Geography

Adjacent counties

 Campbell County - north
 Weston County - northeast
 Niobrara County - east
 Platte County - southeast
 Albany County - south
 Carbon County - southwest
 Natrona County - west
 Johnson County - northwest

National protected areas
Medicine Bow National Forest (part)
Thunder Basin National Grassland (part)

Major highways

  Interstate 25
 U.S. Highway 18
 U.S. Highway 20
 U.S. Highway 26
 U.S. Highway 287
 Wyoming Highway 59

Demographics

2000 census
As of the 2000 United States Census, there were 12,052 people, 4,694 households, and 3,407 families in the county. The population density was 3 people per square mile (1/km2). There were 5,669 housing units at an average density of 1 per square mile (1/km2). The racial makeup of the county was 94.72% White, 0.15% Black or African American, 0.91% Native American, 0.27% Asian, 0.02% Pacific Islander, 2.46% from other races, and 1.47% from two or more races. 5.48% of the population were Hispanic or Latino of any race. 26.6% were of German, 13.5% American, 12.2% English and 11.1% Irish ancestry.

There were 4,694 households, out of which 36.50% had children under the age of 18 living with them, 60.60% were married couples living together, 8.40% had a female householder with no husband present, and 27.40% were non-families. Of 4,694 households, 253 were unmarried partner households: 228 heterosexual, 12 same-sex male, and 13 same-sex female.

23.40% of all households were made up of individuals, and 9.00% had someone living alone who was 65 years of age or older.  The average household size was 2.55 and the average family size was 3.01.

The county population contained 28.50% under the age of 18, 7.00% from 18 to 24, 28.10% from 25 to 44, 25.40% from 45 to 64, and 11.00% who were 65 years of age or older.  The median age was 38 years. For every 100 females there were 99.40 males. For every 100 females age 18 and over, there were 96.40 males.

The median income for a household in the county was $39,603, and the median income for a family was $45,905. Males had a median income of $36,443 versus $19,032 for females. The per capita income for the county was $18,744. About 9.20% of families and 11.60% of the population were below the poverty line, including 15.70% of those under age 18 and 9.70% of those age 65 or over.

2010 census
As of the 2010 United States Census, there were 13,833 people, 5,673 households, and 3,860 families in the county. The racial makeup of the county was 95.1% white, 0.8% American Indian, 0.3% black or African American, 0.3% Asian, 0.1% Pacific islander, 1.7% from other races, and 1.7% from two or more races. Those of Hispanic or Latino origin made up 6.3% of the population. In terms of ancestry, 36.8% were German, 19.8% were Irish, 18.0% were English, and 6.2% were American.

Of the 5,673 households, 32.3% had children under the age of 18 living with them, 55.3% were married couples living together, 8.2% had a female householder with no husband present, 32.0% were non-families, and 26.5% of all households were made up of individuals. The average household size was 2.42 and the average family size was 2.93. The median age was 39.0 years.

The median income for a household in the county was $54,599 and the median income for a family was $69,057. Males had a median income of $54,863 versus $32,025 for females. The per capita income for the county was $27,656. About 4.5% of families and 7.7% of the population were below the poverty line, including 7.8% of those under age 18 and 7.4% of those age 65 or over.

Communities

City
 Douglas (county seat)

Towns
 Glenrock
 Rolling Hills
 Lost Springs

Census-designated places 

 Esterbrook
 Orin

Other unincorporated communities

 Bill
 Boxelder
 Parkerton
 Shawnee

Politics
Like most of Wyoming, Converse County is overwhelmingly Republican. Since Wyoming statehood in 1890, it has only been won by two Democrats – Woodrow Wilson in 1916 and Franklin D. Roosevelt in 1932 and 1936 – and even these two won the county by no more than seven percentage points. The last Democrat to win forty percent of the county's vote was Lyndon Johnson in 1964, and the last to pass so much as 22 percent was Bill Clinton in 1996.

See also
National Register of Historic Places listings in Converse County, Wyoming
Wyoming
List of cities and towns in Wyoming
List of counties in Wyoming
Wyoming statistical areas

References

External links

Converse County Website
Converse County School District #1

 
1888 establishments in Wyoming Territory
Populated places established in 1888